"Hold Me, Thrill Me, Kiss Me" is a 1952 song.

Hold Me, Thrill Me, Kiss Me may also refer to:

Hold Me, Thrill Me, Kiss Me (Gloria Estefan album), 1994, featuring the 1952 song
Hold Me, Thrill Me, Kiss Me (Johnny Mathis album), 1977
Hold Me, Thrill Me, Kiss Me (film), a 1992 film starring Adrienne Shelly

See also
"Hold Me, Thrill Me, Kiss Me, Kill Me," a 1995 song by U2